The football tournament at the 2000 Summer Olympics started on 15 September. The men's tournament is played by U-23 (under 23 years old) national teams, with up to three over age players allowed per squad. Article 1 of the tournament regulations states: "The Tournaments take place every four years, in conjunction with the Summer Olympic Games. The associations affiliated to FIFA are invited to participate with their men's U-23 and women's representative teams."

Venues

* Hindmarsh Stadium only used during the Men's tournament. Temporary seating was added for the games.
''Olympic Stadium only used during the Men's tournament final.

Competition schedule

Medal summary

Medal table

Events

Men's tournament

Women's tournament

Awards

FIFA Fair Play Award

References

External links

 (archived)
Olympic Football Tournaments Sydney 2000 - Men, FIFA.com
Olympic Football Tournaments Sydney 2000 - Women, FIFA.com

 
2000
2000 in association football
2000
2000 Summer Olympics events